ECRIS may refer to:

 European Cenozoic Rift System
 European Criminal Records Information System